The green humphead parrotfish (Bolbometopon muricatum) is the largest species of parrotfish, growing to lengths of  and weighing up to .

It is found on reefs in the Indian and Pacific Oceans, from the Red Sea in the west to Samoa in the east, and from the Yaeyama Islands in the north to the Great Barrier Reef, Australia, in the south.

Other common names include bumphead parrotfish, humphead parrotfish, double-headed parrotfish, buffalo parrotfish, and giant parrotfish.

It is the only species in the monotypic genus Bolbometopon and is the largest herbivorous fish inhabiting coral reefs.

Species description 
Unlike wrasses, it has a vertical head profile, and unlike other parrotfishes, it is uniformly covered with scales except for the leading edge of the head, which is often light green to pink. Primary phase colouration is a dull gray with scattered white spots, gradually becoming uniformly dark green. This species does not display sex-associated patterns of color change. The adult develops a bulbous forehead and the teeth plates are exposed, being only partly covered by lips. The species is slow-growing and long-lived (up to 40 years), with delayed reproduction and low replenishment rates.

This species is gregarious and usually occurs in small aggregations, but group size can be quite large on seaward and clear outer lagoon reefs, exceeding 75 individuals.

Reproduction 
The green humphead parrotfish, is sexually monochromatic, i.e. there is no initial or terminal phase in the life cycle of the adults. The fish spawn pelagically near the outer reef slope or near promontories, gutters, or channel mouths during a lunar cycle, usually spawning just prior to the new moon. They make use of spawning aggregation sites.

Ecology 
Newly settled juveniles are found in branching coral habitats (primarily Acropora) in sheltered lagoons. Small juveniles (<50mm) are often associated with Damselfish. Larger juvenile green humphead parrotfish are found in lagoons, often in seagrass beds, and the adults are found in clear outer lagoons and seaward reefs up to a depth of 30 m. They feed on benthic algae and live corals.

Adult green humphead parrotfish may ram its head against corals to facilitate feeding. Each adult fish ingests over five tons of structural reef carbonates per year, contributing significantly to the bioerosion of reefs. The fish sleeps among corals, in caves and shipwrecks at night, usually in large groups.

Conservation 
The large size, slow growth and schooling behavior of this species mean it is susceptible to overfishing. This species is highly sought after by fishermen throughout its range, and it has declined from overharvesting. Spearfishers and netters target large groups as they sleep at night. The species was identified as a Species of Concern by NOAA/NMFS in 2004, meaning that the species is thought to be threatened, but insufficient data are available to justify a listing under the Endangered Species Act.

Habitat degradation and destruction has accelerated the decline. Juvenile habitats are susceptible to being degraded by poor water quality, such as run-off of sediments from logging.

Spearfishing while scuba diving was banned in American Samoa in 2001. Also, it may not be taken by means of spearfishing with SCUBA gear from 6 pm to 6 am in the US Exclusive Economic Zone waters around these territories. The population of the fish in Palau is now protected by an export ban.

References

External links 

 
 

Articles containing video clips
Taxa named by Achille Valenciennes
Fish described in 1840
Fish of Palau
Monotypic fish genera
Scaridae